Akşehir station is the railway station in the city of Akşehir, Turkey. It is in use since 1894.

Akşehir is an ilçe (district) in Konya Province. Its elevation is   The railroad lies parallel to the Turkish state road .

The station was built in 1894 as the terminal of Afyon-Akşehir railroad during the Ottoman Empire era. Initially it was put into service by Anatolische Eisenbahngesellschaft – Chemins de Fer Ottomans d'Anatolie. Later in 1927, during the Turkish Republic era, it was acquired by Turkish State Railways.

Trains
In addition to freight trains main services are
Meram Ekspres ("Meram Express", İstanbul - Konya)
Konya Mavi Tren ("Konya Blue Train", İzmir - Konya)

References

Akşehir District
Railway stations in Konya Province
Railway stations opened in 1894
1894 establishments in the Ottoman Empire